The Tandy-12 is a computerized arcade game produced by the Tandy Corporation for sale in its Radio Shack chain of stores. The Tandy Corporation acquired Radioshack in 1970. The arcade game featured "12 challenging games of skill". However, most of these were based on luck and freestyle ability. The game had its packaging updated several times since its original release. It was packaged with the game unit itself, a manual, a cardboard playing board, and a set of plastic tokens. The manual is available online. The 1981 Tandy-12 Model number is 60-2159. The 1982 Tandy-12 Model number is 60-2159.

Games
Games included in the Tandy-12 were:

Organ –  Electronic Organ with 12 Notes.
Song Writer – Record a song of up to 44 notes.
Repeat – Follow a random sequence like in Simon.
Torpedo – Fire torpedoes to sink enemy submarines.
Tag-It – Try to catch 110 moles.
Roulette – Electronic Roulette (Uses playing board).
Baseball – Electronic Baseball (Uses playing board).
Repeat Plus – Repeat variant for 2 or more players.
Treasure Hunt – Variant of the board game Master Mind.
Complete – Battle of reaction time.
Fire Away – Destroy enemy invaders.
Hide 'N Seek – Guess the computers 3 numbers in order.

Specifications

Inside the battery compartment is a label with a code on it. This is a date stamp code common to all Radio Shack products of the era.  The first digit "6" indicates the month of manufacture.  The letter "A" is always used as a separator between the year and month.  The last number (2 or 3) indicates the last digit of the year.
For example, "6A2" means that the game was manufactured in June 1982.

References

External links
http://www.computerhistory.org/collections/accession/102626662

Handheld electronic games
RadioShack
1980s toys